The Ganodermataceae are a family of fungi in the order Polyporales. , Index Fungorum accepts 8 genera and 300 species in the family. The family was circumscribed by Dutch mycologist Marinus Anton Donk in 1948 to contain polypores with a double spore wall. The inner wall is verruculose (with moderate-sized growths) to ornamented, thickened and usually coloured, while the outer wall is thin and hyaline.

References

Further reading

 
Fungi described in 1948
Ganodermataceae